West Mahoning Township is a township in Indiana County, Pennsylvania, United States. The population was 1,337 at the 2020 census. The township surrounds Smicksburg, a separately incorporated borough.

Geography
According to the United States Census Bureau, the township has a total area of 29.4 square miles (76.1 km2), all  land.

Demographics

As of the census of 2000, there were 1,128 people, 277 households, and 244 families residing in the township.  The population density was 38.4 people per square mile (14.8/km2).  There were 357 housing units at an average density of 12.2/sq mi (4.7/km2).  The racial makeup of the township was 99.38% White, 0.27% African American, 0.18% Native American, 0.09% Asian, and 0.09% from two or more races.

There were 277 households, out of which 55.2% had children under the age of 18 living with them, 80.9% were married couples living together, 6.1% had a female householder with no husband present, and 11.6% were non-families. 10.8% of all households were made up of individuals, and 5.4% had someone living alone who was 65 years of age or older.  The average household size was 4.07 and the average family size was 4.44.

In the township the population was spread out, with 46.1% under the age of 18, 11.7% from 18 to 24, 21.4% from 25 to 44, 12.3% from 45 to 64, and 8.5% who were 65 years of age or older.  The median age was 20 years. For every 100 females there were 107.7 males.  For every 100 females age 18 and over, there were 100.0 males.

The median income for a household in the township was $23,403, and the median income for a family was $24,554. Males had a median income of $22,396 versus $22,188 for females. The per capita income for the township was $6,907.  About 24.9% of families and 37.7% of the population were below the poverty line, including 52.6% of those under age 18 and 5.7% of those age 65 or over.

References

Townships in Indiana County, Pennsylvania
Townships in Pennsylvania